Heckingham is a small village and parish in the county of Norfolk, England, about a mile east of Loddon.

Church of St Gregory

Its church, St Gregory, is one of 124 existing round-tower churches in Norfolk. It is in care of the Churches Conservation Trust, and is a Grade I listed building.

See also 
 Clavering hundred

Notes

External links

St Gregory's on the European Round Tower Churches Website

Villages in Norfolk
Civil parishes in Norfolk